A port is a facility for receiving ships and transferring cargo.

Port or PORT may also refer to:

Transportation 
 Airport, for air transport
 Spaceport, for space vehicles
 Gun port, an opening in the side of the hull of a ship, above the waterline, which allows the muzzle of artillery pieces mounted on the gun deck to fire outside
 Port of entry, where immigration and customs procedures are fulfilled
 Port and starboard, terms for the left and right sides, respectively, of air- or water-craft

Places
 Port, Ain, a commune in France
 Port, Bern, a commune in Switzerland
 Port, Szczecin, a neighbourhood in Szczecin, Poland
 Port, Templeport, a townland in the parish of Templeport, County Cavan, Republic of Ireland
 Porţ, a village in Marca Commune, Sălaj County, Romania
 Le Port, Ariège, in the Ariège department
 Le Port, Réunion, in the island of Réunion
 Le Port-Marly, in the Yvelines department
 Porto, second largest city of Portugal
 Ports (comarca), a comarca in the Land of Valencia, Spain
 Ports-sur-Vienne, a commune in France
 Ports de Tortosa-Beseit, a mountain massif at the NE end of the Iberian System

People
 Port (surname)

Arts, entertainment, and media
 Port (film), a 1934 Italian film
 PORT, an arts blog edited by Jeff Jahn
 PORT.hu, a Hungarian database of actors and several performance media

Computing and engineering
 Port (circuit theory), a pair of terminals with equal and opposite current flows
 Port (computer networking), a virtual data connection between computer programs
 Port (software), software converted to run on a platform different from the original platform
 Port (video gaming)
 Port, exhaust or transfer orifice of a two-stroke engine
 Bass reflex, also known as a reflex port or ported system, a system to increase loudspeaker efficiency
 Computer port (hardware), a physical interface between a computer and other electronic devices
 I/O port, a location in port address space associated with peripheral device
 Ported barrel, a gun barrel with holes drilled into it that are designed to reduce the tendency of the firearm to flip upwards
 Porting (engine), modification of the shape and size of the engine's ports to enhance aerodynamic flow
 Ports collection, part of the package management infrastructure of modern BSD-derived operating systems package management infrastructure of modern BSD-derived operating systems

Medicine
 Port (medical), a small medical appliance installed in the body
 PORT Score, a tool for predicting risk of death from pneumonia

Other uses
 Port, an Australian term for a schoolbag or, more generally, any type of luggage
 Port wine, a fortified wine (especially when from Portugal)
 Ports 1961, a fashion brand
 Ports Authority F.C., a Sierra Leonean professional football club
 Christopher Newport University, nicknamed Port U.
 Victoria Police Public Order Response Team

See also

 Le Port (disambiguation)
 Port authority (disambiguation)
 Port of Call (disambiguation)
 Porte (disambiguation)
 
 
 Old Port (disambiguation)
 Newport (disambiguation)